Aleksandar Mirković is a politician in Serbia. He has led the Serbian Progressive Party group in the Assembly of the City of Belgrade since 2018 and was elected to the National Assembly of Serbia in the 2020 parliamentary election.

Early life and career
Mirković was born and raised in the Belgrade municipality of Voždovac. He has a bachelor's degree in economics.

Political career

Municipal politician
Mirković was deputy leader of the Progressive Party's municipal board in Belgrade from 2010 to 2013. He received the twenty-sixth position on the party's electoral list in the 2012 Belgrade City Assembly election and was elected when the list won thirty-seven mandates. The election was won by the Democratic Party and its allies, and Mirković served as a member of the opposition. The Democratic-led administration lost its majority in late 2013 and a new city election was called for 2014. Mirković was not a candidate in this election; he instead received the fourteenth position on the Progressive Party's list in the December 2013 Voždovac municipal election and was elected when the list won a majority victory with thirty-six out of fifty-five mandates. The municipal assembly met in January 2014, and Mirković was selected as its president (i.e., speaker). He held this role until March 2016, when he was appointed to a provisional authority for the municipality, pending new elections.

Mirković received the fourth position on the Progressive Party's list in the 2016 Voždovac municipal election and was elected to a second term when the list won twenty-six mandates. Although the Progressive list lost its majority, it remained the dominant force in the municipality's coalition government, and Mirković was appointed to a new term as speaker in June 2016.

He was also re-elected to the Belgrade city assembly in the 2018 city election; he received the thirty-second position on the Progressive list and was returned when the list won a majority victory with sixty-four out of 110 seats. He was named as leader of the Progressive Party group in the city assembly following the election.

He was not a candidate in Voždovac in 2020.

Parliamentarian
Mirković received the fifty-eighth position on the Progressive Party's list in the 2020 Serbian parliamentary election and was elected when the list won a landslide majority with 188 out of 250 mandates. He is now a member of the assembly's defence and internal affairs committee and the committee on Kosovo-Metohija; a deputy member of the committee on spatial planning, transport, infrastructure, and telecommunications; the leader of Serbia's parliamentary friendship group with Argentina; and a member of the parliamentary friendship groups with the Bahamas, Botswana, Brazil, Cameroon, the Central African Republic, Chile, China, Comoros, Cuba, the Dominican Republic, Ecuador, Equatorial Guinea, Eritrea, Greece, Grenada, Guinea-Bissau, Jamaica, Japan, Kyrgyzstan, Laos, Liberia, Madagascar, Mali, Mauritius, Mexico, Morocco, Mozambique, Nauru, Nicaragua, Nigeria, Palau, Papua New Guinea, Paraguay, Peru, Portugal, the Republic of Congo, Russia, Saint Vincent and the Grenadines, Sao Tome and Principe, the Solomon Islands, South Sudan, Spain, Sri Lanka, the countries of Sub-Saharan Africa, Sudan, Suriname, Togo, Trinidad and Tobago, Uruguay, Uzbekistan, and Venezuela.

References

1988 births
Living people
Politicians from Belgrade
Members of the City Assembly of Belgrade
Members of the National Assembly (Serbia)
Serbian Progressive Party politicians